The Legendary Fok is a Hong Kong television series loosely based on the life of the Chinese martial artist Huo Yuanjia (Cantonese: Fok Yuen-gap). It includes a subplot based on the story of Chen Zhen (Cantonese: Chan Zan), a fictional student of Huo Yuanjia and the protagonist of the 1972 film Fist of Fury. The series was first broadcast in 1981 on RTV (now ATV) in Hong Kong.

Cast 
 Note: Some of the characters' names are in Cantonese romanisation.

 Wong Yuen-sun as Fok Yuen-gap
 Bruce Leung as Chan Zan
 Michelle Yim as Chiu Sin-nam
 Bonnie Ngai as Wong Sau-chi (Sakurako)
 Newton Lai as Lung Hoi-sang
 Bill Tung as Fok Yan-tai
 Cheng Lui as Chiu Sing-hin
 Mak Tin-yan as Wong Hei-man (Tanaka)
 Lau Kong as Fok Yuen-mou
 Tam Wing-kit as Lau Chun-shing
 Yeung Kar-on as Luk Tai-on
 Gam San as Chiu Chun-nam
 Yip Tin-hang as Chiu Chun-bak
 Ng Kwok-sing as Fok Yuen-ying
 Ng Wui as Chau-ye

Remake 
A remake of the series, Huo Yuanjia (The Legendary Fok 2008), was released in 2008. It was directed by Kuk Kwok-leung and starred Ekin Cheng, Jordan Chan, Zhou Muyin, Bryan Leung, Ding Li and Qu Yue.

The opening theme song "The Great Wall Never Falls", performed by Johnny Yip, was reused as the opening theme song of Huo Yuanjia (2008) and Huo Yuanjia (2001). However, in Huo Yuanjia (2001), the song was sung in Mandarin instead of Cantonese and was not sung by Yip.

External links 
 The Legendary Fok reviews on spcnet.tv

Martial arts television series
1981 Hong Kong television series debuts
Asia Television original programming
Television series set in the Qing dynasty
Cantonese-language television shows